New York's 130th State Assembly district is one of the 150 districts in the New York State Assembly. It has been represented by Brian Manktelow since 2019.

Geography
District 130 contains portions of Cayuga and Oswego counties, and all of Wayne County.

Recent election results

2022

2020

2018

2016

2014

2012

References

130